This is the discography for Canadian pop singer Garou.

Studio albums

Compilation albums

Live albums

Other works
"Dust in the Wind" in William Joseph's album : "Within" (2004)
"La Rivière de notre enfance" with Michel Sardou (2004)
"Tu es comme ça" with Marilou (2005)

Singles

Footnotes:
A Peak is for the Belgian Ultratip charts.
B "Je suis le même" hit #1 in Quebec for seven weeks.
C "Plus forte que moi" was released as the second radio single from Garou in Quebec.
D "Stand Up" peaked at #3 on the Top 100 BDS Anglophone chart in Quebec and #19 on the National AC audience chart (BDS).

Single certifications 
 "Belle": Diamond - France (750,000)
 "Seul": Diamond - France (990,000); Platinum - Belgium (50,000), Switzerland (40,000)
 "Sous le vent": Diamond - France (750,000)
 "Reviens (Où te caches-tu?)": Silver - France (125,000)
 "La Rivière de notre enfance": Gold - France (425,000)
 "Tu es comme ça": Silver - France (125,000)

References 

Discographies of Canadian artists
Pop music discographies